Palsit railway station is a Kolkata Suburban Railway station on the Howrah–Bardhaman main line operated by Eastern Railway zone of Indian Railways. It is situated beside Palla Road, National Highway 2, at Sekhpur, Palsit, Purba Bardhaman district in the Indian state of West Bengal.

History
On 1 February 1855 the first train ran from Howrah to  through Howrah–Bardhaman main line. Bandel to Bardhaman route was opened for traffic on 1 January 1885. Electrification of the Howrah–Bardhaman main line was initiated up to Bandel in 1957, with the 3000V DC system, and the entire Howrah–Bardhaman route including Palsit railway station completed with AC system, along with conversion of earlier DC portions to 25 kV AC, in 1958.

References

Railway stations in Purba Bardhaman district
Kolkata Suburban Railway stations
Howrah railway division